Gary Langridge (born 5 April 1952) is a New Zealand cricketer. He played in thirty first-class and eleven List A matches for Central Districts from 1976 to 1982.

See also
 List of Central Districts representative cricketers

References

External links
 

1952 births
Living people
New Zealand cricketers
Central Districts cricketers
Cricketers from Wellington City